North Korea (officially the Democratic People's Republic of Korea) competed at the 2012 Summer Olympics in London, from 27 July to 12 August 2012. This was the nation's ninth appearance at the Olympics since its debut in 1972. North Korean athletes did not attend the 1984 Summer Olympics in Los Angeles, when they joined the Soviet boycott, and subsequently, led a boycott at the 1988 Summer Olympics in Seoul, along with six other nations.

Olympic Committee of the Democratic People's Republic of Korea sent the nation's third largest delegation ever to the Games. A total of 51 athletes, 15 men and 36 women, competed in 10 sports. Women's football was the only team-based sport in which North Korea was represented at these Olympic games. There was only a single competitor in archery, judo, and shooting. Marathon runner Pak Song-chol became the first track and field athlete to carry the North Korean flag at the opening ceremony. For the first time since its Olympic return in 1992, North Korea did not qualify athletes in gymnastics.

North Korea left London with a total of 7 medals (4 gold and 3 bronze), beating its record from the 2008 Summer Olympics in Beijing. Along with the 1992 Summer Olympics, this was also the nation's most successful Olympics for the number of gold medals received at a single games. All of these medals were awarded to the team in judo, weightlifting, and wrestling.

Medalists

| width="78%" align="left" valign="top" |

| width="22%" align="left" valign="top" |

Archery

Athletics

North Korean athletes have so far achieved qualifying standards in the following athletics events (up to a maximum of 3 athletes in each event at the 'A' Standard, and 1 at the 'B' Standard):

Key
 Note – Ranks given for track events are within the athlete's heat only
 Q = Qualified for the next round
 q = Qualified for the next round as a fastest loser or, in field events, by position without achieving the qualifying target
 NR = National record
 N/A = Round not applicable for the event
 Bye = Athlete not required to compete in round

Men

Women

Boxing

North Korea has qualified boxers for the following events.

Men

Women

Diving

North Korea has qualified in the following events.

Men

Women

Football

North Korea is qualified for the women's event
 Women's team event – 1 team of 18 players

Women's tournament

Team roster

Group play

† Game delayed by one hour due to North Korean protest after erroneous use of South Korean flag for North Korea.

Judo

Shooting

The following quota place has been qualified for the North Korean shooting squad at the Games;

Women

Synchronized swimming

North Korea has qualified 2 quota places in synchronized swimming.

Table tennis

North Korea has qualified 6 quotas athlete for singles table tennis events.
Men

Women

Weightlifting

North Korea has qualified 5 men and 3 women.

Men

 Kim Myong-hyok originally finished fourth, but in June 2021, he was promoted to bronze due to the disqualification of Răzvan Martin.

Women

Wrestling

North Korea has qualified in the following events.

Key
  - Victory by Fall.
  - Decision by Points - the loser with technical points.
  - Decision by Points - the loser without technical points.

Men's freestyle

Men's Greco-Roman

Women's freestyle

See also
 North Korea at the 2012 Summer Paralympics

References

Nations at the 2012 Summer Olympics
2012
Summer Olympics